Bent Rigg Radar Station, (also known as Royal Air Force Ravenscar, and Ravenscar tracking station), was a radar site located at Bent Rigg,  south of  Ravenscar, North Yorkshire, England. Several radar stations had been located in the Ravenscar area from 1938, but a more permanent site was built at Bent Rigg in 1941, which was crewed by technicians and other staff from the Royal Air Force. Bent Rigg, and the wider location around Ravenscar, was deemed "attractive" for the siting of long-range finding equipment. It was originally part of the Coastal Defence/Chain Home Low (CD/CHL) system, designed to detect shipping. Later, it was upgraded with more powerful equipment as part of the Chain Home Extra Low (CHEL). The last recorded use of the station was in September 1944, and it is believed that the site closed soon afterwards.

A few structures remain at the site, with the foundations of the accommodation blocks still extant near an abandoned railway line to the west. The site is open to the public, being located next to the Cleveland Way, and the National Trust have erected information boards detailing the buildings and the history of the site.

History
The proposal to site a radar at Ravenscar was first mooted in 1937, when a party from the Directorate of Works, and representatives from Bawdsey, assessed at least ten locations from the Isle of Wight to Berwick-upon-Tweed. Ravenscar and a site near Bridlington, were assessed but later dropped in favour of Danby Beacon and Staxton Wold. The Air Ministry was "galvanised" to complete the radar programme ahead of schedule, and so the mobile radars that were stored at Bawdsey for deployment overseas, were pressed into action at Ravenscar and other key locations. The equipment didn't last very long at Ravenscar, being donated in spring 1939 to an accelerated site at Netherbutton in the Orkney Islands. With Ottercops Moss in Northumberland now active and covering the Tyneside area, the equipment at Bent Rigg/Ravenscar was dismantled on 1 May 1939, and taken up to Rosyth for shipping to the Orkneys.

By September 1939, Ravenscar had been re-equipped, and was manned initially by members of the 29th Coast Observer Detachment (part of the 526th Durham Coast Regiment). It was later due to receive some  towers as part of the "Intermediate Chain Home" (ICH) programme, albeit still with the Ravenscar site being temporary, but the location was ideal for the siting of radar. Richardson and Dennison labelled the site "attractive" for the siting of long-range detecting devices, as it occupied "..a broad, visible sweep of the horizon.. [and] an elevated position". It fulfilled the requirements of a radar site as stated by Bragg in the book "RDF 1 : the location of aircraft by radio methods 1935-1945"-  Work on the site began in late 1940, and by October 1941, along with the Dronehill and West Beckham sites, Bent Rigg was commissioned as an ACH (Advanced Chain Home) location, with at least four permanent structures on the technical site. Its original designation was station M47; however, when it was upgraded to the Chain Home Extra Low system, it was labelled as K47. As M47, it was one of five sites along the Yorkshire coast in the Coastal Defence/Chain Home Low (CD/CHL) system. The re-designation as station K47 under the CHEL system, saw it equipped with a centimetric Type 52 radar. 

Improvements in radar technology, meant that enhanced stations had the ability to scan further and wider, resulting in the need for fewer stations. As part of the Chain Home Extra Low system, Bent Rigg was one of three on the Yorkshire coast, and the only one on its original site, the other two being Saltburn (on a different site to the "M" station), and Flamborough Head (a new site called RAF Bempton).

Whilst the railway line was open when the radar station was in use, supplies and personnel may have been carried by the railway, although no platform was built at the site, with railway station at  being the nearest railhead. At other radar sites built around the same time, and to the same specifications (such as Craster and Goldsborough), pathways marked by upright stones were evident, which was thought to allow workers to navigate the site during a blackout.

It was later staffed by communications technicians from the Royal Air Force , becoming known in Air Force documents as RAF Ravenscar, which was part of No. 73 (Signals) Wing RAF, which had their headquarters in Malton, North Yorkshire.

Whilst it is not exactly certain, it is believed that the site was closed sometime soon after September 1944, when it was last recorded in use. What remains of the permanent structures is the communications hut, engine house, fuel store and the transmitter/receiver block, which are part of the scheduled designation. The coastguard tower on the cliff edge, and a fifth building on the southern edge of the site, are not part of the scheduled monument. It is uncertain what function this building was required for. 
The domestic accommodation was demolished in the latter part of the 1940s, but the foundations are still visible on the west side of the field bordering the former railway line. The site was labelled with many names; those who served there from the RAF referred to the site as RAF Ravenscar. Other names are Bent Rigg, which is the most common, and Radio Tracking Station Ravenscar.

Buildings
The site at Ravenscar is now on National Trust land, and along with RAF Bempton further down the Yorkshire coast, is one of six radar sites across England with a preservation order, or scheduled monument designation. The site at Ravenscar is said to be the best example of a World War Two radar station along the coastline of Yorkshire and the north east. Four structures at the technical site remain near to the cliff edge, which is accessible to the public either from the Cleveland Way, or from the Cinder Path, which is the former trackbed of the Scarborough and Whitby Railway line. Three of the extant buildings are of a concrete construction, whilst the fourth is a Nissen hut. Whilst it is recorded that the technical area was functioning by February 1942, the Nissen Hut must be a later addition as that type of hut did not go into production until May 1942. A fifth building on the southern edge of the field, is believed to have been involved with the main power supply. It is not in the official scheduled designation.

The National Trust have designated the buildings as follows:

See also

RAF Bempton
RAF Danby Beacon
RAF Goldsborough
RAF Holmpton
RAF Oxenhope Moor
RRH Staxton Wold

Notes

References

Sources

External links

A cluster of technical buildings marked "lookout" at Grid 991009 on a 1954 OS Map
UK map of CHL stations

Buildings and structures in North Yorkshire
Royal Air Force stations in Yorkshire
Radar stations
Military history of North Yorkshire